South Korea participated at the 2015 Summer Universiade in Gwangju, South Korea.

Medal summary

Medal by sports

Medalists

References
 korea.htm Country overview: South Korea on the official website

Nations at the 2015 Summer Universiade
2015
2015 in South Korean sport